Sivananda, also known as Swami Sivananda, is a yoga teacher from India, who has claimed to be born on 8 August 1896 (unverified) in Sylhet District of Bengal Presidency of British India. On 21 March 2022, he was awarded Padma Shri by the Government of India.

Biography 

Sivananda is alleged to have been born on 8 August 1896, although this has not been independently verified. Indian media have taken his claimed date of birth at face value but credible sources supporting/contravening the same are lacking. He was born in Sylhet District of Bengal Presidency of British India (present-day Sylhet Division of Bangladesh).

His parents lived in extreme poverty and even had to beg for their living. His sister, mother, and father all died within a month of each other when he was just six years old. Then he travelled to Kashi from Bengal and began serving there. Swami Sivananda mastered yoga and meditation after receiving his education from Guru Omkarananda.

For over three decades, he has taught yoga on the banks of river Ganga in Varanasi. Over the last fifty years he has served 400–600 beggars affected by leprosy. He arranges food, fruits, clothes, winter garments, blankets, mosquito nets, and cooking utensils for their needs. He promotes Yoga.

Sivananda is a vegetarian. He calls fruit and milk fancy food and avoids eating them, instead preferring lentils and rice. He has been an active supporter of COVID-19 vaccines.

Awards 
Sivananda is the recipient of several awards including the Yoga Ratna Award, the Basundhara Ratan Award (2019). In March 2022, he was awarded Padma Shri by the Government of India.

See also

 List of Padma Shri award recipients (2020–2029)

References

Living people
Indian Hindus
Indian yoga teachers
Longevity claims
Old age
Recipients of the Padma Shri
Year of birth missing (living people)